Nilanjana Sarkar aka Neelanjona Sabyasachi Thakur is a playback singer who received the 57th National Film Awards (2009) for her song in the Bengali film Houseful. She has several ad jingles to her credit.  The song bish, for which she won the national award, was composed by the band Kaya. She is also famed as RJ Neel of 92.7 Big Fm. Her show Raater Otithi ruled the airwaves over a decade.

She married Sabyasachi Chakraborty Thakur on 2 December 2018.

Notes

 

Year of birth missing (living people)
Living people
Bollywood playback singers
Indian women playback singers
Best Female Playback Singer National Film Award winners
21st-century Indian singers
21st-century Indian women singers
Women musicians from West Bengal